Theater District/South 9th Street was a light rail station on Link light rail's T Line in Tacoma, Washington, United States. The station officially opened for service on August 22, 2003; it was located at the northern end of downtown and named for the several nearby performing arts venues.

The station closed on August 1, 2022, as part of work to connect the T Line with its extension to the Hilltop neighborhood. In 2023, another station will open two blocks north, adjacent to the Old City Hall building.

Artwork at the station reflects the Theater District:
 Seats at the station resemble fold-up theater seats
 Bronze plaques in the ground are reproductions of historical theatrical posters
 Projectors project theatrical scenes on screens at night

References

2003 establishments in Washington (state)
Buildings and structures in Tacoma, Washington
Link light rail stations in Pierce County, Washington
Railway stations in the United States opened in 2003
Transportation in Tacoma, Washington
Railway stations closed in 2022